John Thomas may refer to:

Politics

United Kingdom
 John Thomas (c. 1490–1540/42), British Member of Parliament for Truro
 John Thomas (c. 1531–1581/90), British Member of Parliament for Mitchell 
 John Aeron Thomas (1850–1935), British Member of Parliament for Gower, 1900–1906
 John Thomas (Welsh politician) (born 1852), Welsh county councillor and miners' agent
 John Thomas (British politician) (1897–1968), British Member of Parliament for Dover
 John Stradling Thomas (1925–1991), Welsh Conservative Party politician
 John Thomas, Baron Thomas of Cwmgiedd (born 1947), British judge
 Sir John Thomas, 1st Baronet, Sheriff of Glamorgan in 1700

United States
 John Chew Thomas (1764–1836), U.S. congressman from Maryland
 John Thomas (New York politician) (1792–1866), New York politician
 John Warwick Thomas (1800–1871), North Carolina state legislator and founder of Thomasville, North Carolina
 John Addison Thomas (1811–1858), U.S. Assistant Secretary of State
 John J. Thomas (1813–1895), Confederate politician
 John E. Thomas (politician) (1829–1910), Wisconsin state assemblyman and senator
 John Lewis Thomas Jr. (1835–1893), U.S. congressman from Maryland
 John O. Thomas (1867–1961), Wisconsin state assemblyman
 John R. Thomas (1846–1914), U.S. congressman from Illinois
 John W. Thomas (Wisconsin politician) (1846–1925), Wisconsin state legislator and railroad commissioner
 John W. Thomas (1874–1945), U.S. Senator from Idaho
 John W. Thomas (sheriff) (1815–1888), sheriff of Norfolk County, Massachusetts
 Elmer Thomas (John William Elmer Thomas, 1876–1965), U.S. Senator from Oklahoma
 J. Parnell Thomas (1895–1970), U.S. congressman from New Jersey
 John M. Thomas (1926–2012), U.S. Assistant Secretary of State in the 1970s
 John Charles Thomas (judge) (born 1950), Virginia supreme court justice
 John W. E. Thomas (1847–1899), American businessman, educator, and Illinois politician

Military
 John Thomas (American general) (1724–1776), American general in the American Revolutionary War
 John Thomas (VC) (1886–1954), English soldier and recipient of the Victoria Cross
 John Wallace Thomas (1888–1965), Newfoundland and Canadian merchant mariner who served in First and Second World Wars
 John Wellesley Thomas (1822–1908), British military officer

Religion and theology
 John Thomas (bishop of Winchester) (1696–1781), previously Bishop of Salisbury
 John Thomas (bishop of Rochester) (1712–1793), previously Dean of Westminster
 John Thomas (bishop of Salisbury) (1691–1766), previously Bishop of St Asaph and Bishop of Lincoln
 John Thomas (priest, born 1736) (1736–1769), Welsh Anglican priest and antiquarian
 John Thomas (priest, born 1891) (1891–1959), Welsh Anglican priest
 John Thomas (Christadelphian) (1805–1871), British Christian theologian, and founder of the Christadelphians
 John Lloyd Thomas (1908–1984), Anglican clergyman
 John Christopher Thomas (born c. 1955), American Pentecostal theologian
 John H. Thomas (born c. 1950), American clergyman, General Minister and President of the United Church of Christ, 1999–2009
 Jack Thomas (bishop) (John James Absalom Thomas; 1908–1995), Bishop of Swansea and Brecon

Sport
 John Thomas (American football) (born 1935), American football player for the San Francisco 49ers
 John Thomas (Australian footballer) (1935–2011), Australian rules footballer for Geelong
 John Thomas (athlete) (1941–2013), American high jumper
 John Thomas (Australian cricketer) (1852–1915), cricketer for Tasmania
 John Thomas (English cricketer) (1879–1949), cricketer for Somerset
 John Thomas (basketball) (born 1975), American basketball player
 John Thomas (figure skater) (born 1960), Canadian ice dancer
 John Thomas (Welsh footballer) (died 1920), Welsh footballer for Sheffield United and Gainsborough Trinity in the 1890s
 John Thomas (Irish footballer), Irish international footballer
 John Thomas (footballer, born 1958), English footballer for Preston North End and Bolton Wanderers
 John Thomas (ice hockey) (1936–1995), Australian ice hockey player
 John Thomas (lacrosse) (born 1952), American lacrosse player
 John Webster Thomas (1900–1977), American college football player for the Chicago Maroons
 Ron Thomas (bowls) (John Ronald Thomas), Welsh international lawn and indoor bowler
 John Thomas (baseball), American baseball player

Music
 John Charles Thomas (1891–1960), American baritone opera singer
 John Rogers Thomas (1830–1896), American composer
 John Thomas (harpist) (1826–1913), Welsh composer and musician
 John Weston Thomas (1921–1992), Welsh harpmaker
 "Big" John Thomas (1952–2016), British lead guitarist with Budgie

Art
 John Thomas (sculptor) (1813–1862), British sculptor who worked on British palaces
 John Evan Thomas (1810–1873), Welsh sculptor
 John Paul Thomas (1927–2001), American artist, principally in Hawaii

Film
 John G. Thomas (born 1948), American filmmaker
 John Thomas (cinematographer), winner of the 1995 Independent Spirit Award for Best Cinematography
 John Thomas (screenwriter) (fl. late 20th century), co-screenwriter for the movie Predator

Education
 John L. Thomas (c. 1927–2005), American historian
 John Martin Thomas (1869–1952), Twelfth president of Rutgers University
 John Peyre Thomas Sr. (1833–1912), South Carolina educator, politician and historian
 John R. Thomas (professor), American intellectual property professor

Other areas
 John Thomas (photographer) (1838–1905), Welsh photographer
 John Jacob Thomas (1841–1889), Trinidadian linguist and writer
 John Rochester Thomas (1848–1901), American architect
 John Henry Thomas (1854–1928), Australian composer, editor, and conductor
 John Henry Thomas (shipping) (1869–1931), American shipping business and port director
 John Hudson Thomas (1878–1945), American architect
 John B. Thomas (1925–2018), American electrical engineer, educator and professor
 John E. Thomas (1926–1996), Canadian philosopher
 John Meurig Thomas (1932–2020), British chemist and materials scientist
 John Floyd Thomas Jr. (born 1936), Californian murderer
 John Henry Malamah Thomas, Sierra Leonean entrepreneur and mayor of Freetown, Sierra Leone
 John Thomas Idlet (1931–2002), American Beat poet

Other uses
 UK slang for penis
John Thomas sign

See also
 
 
 Johnny Thomas (disambiguation)